John M. Chambers (1845 – June 11, 1916) was an Irish-American businessman and politician from New York.

Life 
Chambers was born in 1845 in Ireland. He immigrated to America when he was very young. He lived in Lansingburgh since 1850.

When he was young he entered the grocery business in Lansingburgh, starting the firm Davenport & Chambers. He ran the business until his death.

Chambers served as village clerk, receiver of taxes, town supervisor, school trustee, and village trustee. In 1892, he was elected to the New York State Assembly as a Republican, representing the Rensselaer County 2nd District. He served in the Assembly in 1893, 1894, 1895, 1902, and 1903.

Chambers was married. He had two daughters, Mary C. and Anna M. He was an active member of the local Presbyterian Church and served on its board of trustees. He was a member of the Freemasons and the Royal Arch Masonry.

Chambers died at home on June 11, 1916. He was buried in New Mount Ida Cemetery in Troy.

References

External links 

 The Political Graveyard
 John M. Chambers at Find a Grave

1845 births
1916 deaths
Irish emigrants to the United States (before 1923)
People from Lansingburgh, New York
Town supervisors in New York (state)
19th-century American politicians
20th-century American politicians
Republican Party members of the New York State Assembly
American Freemasons
Presbyterians from New York (state)
Burials in New York (state)